Cocola Broadcasting is a broadcasting company based in Fresno, California. Founded in the early 1980s by Valley broadcasting veteran Gary Cocola, Cocola owns two full-power digital television stations KGMC in Fresno and KKJB in Boise, along with several low-power television stations in Central California and Boise. Cocola was one of the first broadcasters in the US to take advantage of the opportunities of low-powered television, after the FCC approved such stations in the early 1980s.

Television stations by DMA

Sacramento, California

Fresno, California

Boise, Idaho

Santa Barbara/Santa Maria, California and region

Monterey, California

Bakersfield, California

Former stations

References

External links
 Cocola Broadcasting

Television broadcasting companies of the United States
Companies based in Fresno County, California